Joseph Heathcote (January 1878 – unknown) was an English footballer who played as a forward. Born in Ardwick, Manchester, he played for Berry's Association and Newton Heath.

External links
MUFCInfo.com profile

1878 births
Year of death missing
People from Ardwick
Footballers from Manchester
English footballers
Association football forwards
Manchester United F.C. players